Messe Süd is a railway station in the Westend district of Berlin.

History
When the station opened in 1928 it was originally entitled Berlin Eichkamp, the name of a garden city just south of it, built in the 1920s according to plans of Max Taut. The station was renamed Messe Süd in 2002 to assist visitors to Berlin in finding their way to the Messe (trade fair) halls on its northern side.

The former AVUS racing track and the Deutschlandhalle arena are nearby.

References

Berlin S-Bahn stations
Buildings and structures in Charlottenburg-Wilmersdorf
Railway stations in Germany opened in 1928